Brian Paul Klaas (born June 29, 1986) is an American political scientist and contributing writer at The Atlantic. He is an associate professor in global politics at University College London. He is the author of Corruptible: Who Gets Power and How It Changes Us. He is also the co-author of How to Rig an Election.

Early life and education
Klaas was born in Golden Valley, Minnesota. He earned a BA (Summa cum laude) from Carleton College (2008), where he was elected to Phi Beta Kappa. He earned an MPhil degree in political science from St. Antony's College, University of Oxford. He subsequently completed his DPhil in political science at New College, University of Oxford.

Career 
Klaas is associate professor in global politics at University College London. After completing his DPhil at New College, University of Oxford, he was a Fellow in Comparative Politics at the London School of Economics.

Klaas is a frequent commentator in the media on US foreign policy and democratization. His articles have been published in The New York Times, The Financial Times, Foreign Affairs, Foreign Policy, the Los Angeles Times, and The Guardian. He appears regularly on MSNBC, CNBC, BBC, CNN and other outlets.

He was policy director and deputy campaign manager for Mark Dayton's successful bid for governor of Minnesota in 2010.

Published works
 The Despot's Accomplice: How the West is Aiding and Abetting the Decline of Democracy, Hurst, 2016, 
 The Despot's Apprentice: Donald Trump's Attack on Democracy, Skyhorse Publishing, 2017, 
 How to Rig an Election, Yale University Press, 2018, 
Corruptible: Who Gets Power and How It Changes Us, Scribner, 2021,

References

Further reading
 Scholar Brian Klaas on how Trump is an aspiring despot who is steadily eroding our democracy
 Author Brian Klaas: Is Trump an “aspiring despot” or a “bumbling showman”? Yes!

External links 
 Official website
 LSE profile page
 

1986 births
21st-century American male writers
21st-century American non-fiction writers
Academics of the London School of Economics
Alumni of New College, Oxford
Alumni of St Antony's College, Oxford
American columnists
American expatriate academics
American expatriates in England
American male non-fiction writers
American political scientists
Carleton College alumni
Hopkins High School alumni
Living people
People from Golden Valley, Minnesota
The Washington Post people